Carpender or Carpendar may refer to:

Surnames:
 Carpender, English phonetic variant of the surname Carpenter

Places:
 Carpenders Park, a suburb of Watford in Hertfordshire, England
 Carpenders Park railway station, a railway station on the Watford DC Line in Hertfordshire, England

See also

 Carpenter (disambiguation)